This article comprises four sortable tables of mountain summits of greater North America that are the higher than any other point north or south of their latitude or east or west their longitude in North America.

The summit of a mountain or hill may be measured in three principal ways:
The topographic elevation of a summit measures the height of the summit above a geodetic sea level.
The topographic prominence of a summit is a measure of how high the summit rises above its surroundings.
The topographic isolation (or radius of dominance) of a summit measures how far the summit lies from its nearest point of equal elevation.



Northernmost high summits

The following summits range from Greenland and Ellesmere Island to Alaska.

Southernmost high summits

The following summits range from Panamá to Alaska.

Easternmost high summits

The following summits range from Greenland to Costa Rica to Alaska.

Westernmost high summits

All of the following summits are located in the US State of Alaska.

Gallery

See also

North America
Geography of North America
Geology of North America
Lists of mountain peaks of North America
List of mountain peaks of North America
List of the highest major summits of North America
List of the major 5000-meter summits of North America
List of the major 4000-meter summits of North America
List of the major 3000-meter summits of North America
List of the highest islands of North America
List of the most prominent summits of North America
List of the ultra-prominent summits of North America
List of the most isolated major summits of North America
List of the major 100-kilometer summits of North America

List of mountain peaks of Greenland
List of mountain peaks of Canada
List of mountain peaks of the Rocky Mountains
List of mountain peaks of the United States
List of mountain peaks of México
List of mountain peaks of Central America
List of mountain peaks of the Caribbean
:Category:Mountains of North America
commons:Category:Mountains of North America
Physical geography
Topography
Topographic elevation
Topographic prominence
Topographic isolation

Notes

References

External links

Natural Resources Canada (NRC)
Canadian Geographical Names @ NRC
United States Geological Survey (USGS)
Geographic Names Information System @ USGS
United States National Geodetic Survey (NGS)
Geodetic Glossary @ NGS
NGVD 29 to NAVD 88 online elevation converter @ NGS
Survey Marks and Datasheets @ NGS
Instituto Nacional de Estadística, Geografía e Informática (INEGI)
Sistemas Nacionales Estadístico y de Información Geográfica (SNEIG)
Bivouac.com
Peakbagger.com
Peaklist.org
Peakware.com
Summitpost.org

Mountains of North America

Geography of North America

Lists of mountains of North America